Ariel Martínez Marrero (born May 28, 1996) is a Cuban professional baseball catcher for the Hokkaido Nippon-Ham Fighters of Nippon Professional Baseball (NPB). He previously played for the Chunichi Dragons (NPB) and the Cocodrilos de Matanzas in the Cuban National Series.

Professional career

Chunichi Dragons
On March 14, 2018, Martínez signed with the Chunichi Dragons on a developmental contract. He spent the 2018 and 2019 seasons with Chunichi's farm team. On July 1, 2020, Martinez was given a full-time rostered deal and a new shirt number, 57. Martínez notched 5 hits in 18 plate appearances for Chunichi in 2020. The Cuban catcher Ariel Martinez shone again on Wednesday in Japanese baseball, when he hit a homer that led to the victory of the Chunichi Dragons over the Yakult Swallows. Playing left field, the versatile Martinez went 2-3, with a run scored and a walk, to leave his average at .333, and get the only run of the game, which ended 1-0 in favor of his team. He became a free agent following the 2022 season.

Hokkaido Nippon-Ham Fighters
On December 21, 2022, Martinez signed with the Hokkaido Nippon-Ham Fighters of Nippon Professional Baseball.

Personal life
Like most of the Cuban children from his generation, Ariel Martínez admires legendary Cuban catcher Ariel Pestano. One catcher that he likes to study and emulate his game off of is Kansas City Royals catcher Salvador Pérez. He tries to watch film of him often and he definitely enjoys catching plenty of Kansas City Royals games on television when he can.

References

External links
, NPB

1996 births
Living people
Chunichi Dragons players
Cuban expatriate baseball players in Japan
Nippon Professional Baseball catchers
Cocodrilos de Matanzas players
Sportspeople from Matanzas
Hokkaido Nippon-Ham Fighters players
2023 World Baseball Classic players